Ekpoma is a town  in Edo State, Nigeria. It is the administrative headquarters of the Esan West Local Government Area. Ekpoma lies on the geographical coordinate of latitude .
The town has an official Post Office, and it is home to the Ambrose Alli University. Currently Ekpoma town is developing with major infrastructures, hospitals, schools, modern eateries and roads. The town is also secured.

Population 
It has a population of over 290,000 people. It has an adult male population of over 90,000 and adult female population of over 80,000. Ekpoma along with Uromi are the prime towns of the Esan people. It has become a congregating center for years, the Esan people from other towns have consistently taken residence in Ekpoma and Uromi. Ambrose Alli University is located in Ekpoma.

People  
The people are mainly of Esan tribe, and are predominantly academic and non-academic staffs of Ambrose Alli University, owners of small scale medium enterprises (SME's), subsistence farmers and others which include civil service, trading, transportation and students of Ambrose Alli University. The people of Ekpoma are said to have originated from Benin, their language is similar to that of Benin dialect except for some differences in the form of words and also their intonation or pronunciation may be a little different.

The head of the town is known as or called the Onojie. This position is hereditary in which a son succeeds his father. The Onojie palace is in an environment named Eguare. The village council comprises ohe Edition, also known as the Elders, led by most Eldest in the community known as the Odionwele. The Edion are responsible for trying cases and settle disputes in the community. Messages or Information are passed from the Onojie through the Okhaimon to the Odionwele who will call a meeting of elders in order to discuss rising matters.

Health 
The community enjoys a blend of traditional and orthodox medicine, with the presence of two general hospitals, some privately owned hospitals, and Government-owned health centers, and is also closely linked with Irrua Specialist Teaching Hospital, Irrua, where a lot of inhabitants visit to receive health care.  Traditional bonesetters, traditional birth attendants, and herbal healers are also fairly distributed around the town setting. The caliber of staff commonly found at the health centers includes community health extension workers, nurses, auxiliary nurses and doctors. Services offered at these centers include health education, immunization, family planning counselling, treatment of minor ailments and first aid, referrals, and anti-natal.

References

Populated places in Edo State